Melissa Ponzio is an American actress, best known for her roles as Melissa McCall on Teen Wolf and Karen on The Walking Dead. Most recently, Ponzio has starred in Chicago Fire as Donna Robbins.

Life and career 
As of the late 1990s, Ponzio began appearing in supporting guest roles on television series, including Dawson's Creek, One Tree Hill, Surface, Drop Dead Diva, CSI: Crime Scene Investigation, The Gates, NCIS, The Following and Banshee. She also appeared in films The Greenskeeper (2002), Road Trip: Beer Pong (2009), Life as We Know It (2010) and Upside (2010).

Ponzio is known for her recurring roles as Angie on the Lifetime Television drama series Army Wives (2007–2009), and as Melissa McCall in the MTV teen drama Teen Wolf (2011–2017). In 2013, she had a recurring role as Karen in the AMC drama series The Walking Dead.

In September 2021, it was announced that a reunion film for Teen Wolf had been ordered by Paramount+, with Jeff Davis returning as a screenwriter and executive producer of the film. The majority of the original cast members, including Ponzio, were set to reprise their roles. The film was released on January 26, 2023.

Filmography

Film

Television

Podcast

References

External links 
 

Living people
American television actresses
American film actresses
20th-century American actresses
21st-century American actresses
Year of birth missing (living people)